Øystein Bråten (born 21 July 1995) is a Norwegian freestyle skier. He competed at the 2014 Winter Olympics in Sochi, where he placed tenth in slopestyle. Bråten again competed in slopestyle at the 2018 Winter Olympics in Pyeongchang, in which he won a gold medal.

He is a brother of snowboarder Gjermund Bråten.

References

External links
 
 
 
 
 

1995 births
Living people
People from Hol
Norwegian male freestyle skiers
Freestyle skiers at the 2014 Winter Olympics
Freestyle skiers at the 2018 Winter Olympics
Olympic freestyle skiers of Norway
Medalists at the 2018 Winter Olympics
Olympic gold medalists for Norway
Olympic medalists in freestyle skiing
X Games athletes
Sportspeople from Viken (county)